The 1973–74 NBA season was the Kings 25th season in the NBA and their second season in the city of Kansas City.

Draft picks

Roster

Regular season

Season standings

z – clinched division title
y – clinched division title
x – clinched playoff spot

Record vs. opponents

Game log

Awards and records
 Ron Behagen, NBA All-Rookie Team 1st Team

References

Kansas City-Omaha
Sacramento Kings seasons
Kansas
Kansas